The Antrim Times is a regional newspaper covering Antrim town area of Northern Ireland.

It was first published in 1985.

References

Newspapers published in Northern Ireland
Mass media in County Antrim